Thithimathi is a small town in Kodagu district of Karnataka state, India. As of 2020, the population was 48, with 24 men and 24 women.

Location
Thithimathi is located some 78 km from Mysore, 58 km from Madikeri, 191 km from Mangalore, and 214 km from Bangalore.

Post Office
Thithimathi has a post office and the postal code is 571254.

Nearby villages
 Mayamudi - 9 km
 Mekur Hosakeri - 9 km
 Maldare - 13 km
 Gonikoppal - 10 km

Transportation
There is no airport or railway station in Thithimathi.  Nearest travel point is Mysore at a distance of 78 km. There are buses to Thithimathi from Gonikoppal, Mysore and Madikeri.

Educational organisations
 Thithimathi Government PU  College.
 Thithimathi government high school.
 Thithimathi government primary school.
 Marooru government primary school.
 Devamacchi Government Primary school.

References

Villages in Kodagu district